KJUG-FM (106.7 FM) is a radio station broadcasting a country music format. Licensed to Tulare, California, United States, it serves the cities of Visalia-Tulare-Hanford-Porterville, and other rural communities in the region. The station is currently owned by Momentum Broadcasting, LP.

External links

JUG-FM